Charles Rozanski (born March 11, 1955) is a German-American retailer and columnist, known as the President and CEO of the Denver, Colorado-based Mile High Comics Inc., and a columnist for the Comics Buyer's Guide.

Early life
Rozanski was born March 11, 1955, in Goldbach, Bavaria, West Germany, and later moved to the United States with his mother and stepfather, an American Army officer.

Career

Mile High Comics
In 1969, when Rozanski was 13, he began working out of his parents' Colorado basement, selling back issues of comic books by running mail order ads in the magazine Rocket's Blast Comicollector. The following year, he began promoting comics as the youngest seller ever to exhibit at the Colorado Springs Antiques Market. In 1971, he founded the Colorado Springs Comics Club. The following year, he attended his first national comics convention, Multicon in Oklahoma City, where he sold $1,800 USD in comics in three days. It was this point that he realized comics retailing could be a career. He opened his first store in Boulder, Colorado, in 1974 with $800 in cash and 10,000 comics. By 1977, he had expanded to four stores in the greater Denver area. In December of that year, he purchased the Edgar Church Collection, the largest and highest-quality Golden Age comics collection ever discovered. The cache had been preserved due to the unvarying 60 degree temperature and minimal humidity, and consisted of 16,000 comic books dating from 1937 to 1955, including the first Superman comic and the first Marvel Comic. The purchase of the Church Collection helped Mile High Comics expand its influence nationally, and helped bring a geometric rise to the price of rare comic books, which became a legitimate investment. Rozanski once sold a batch of comics from the Church Collection and used the profits to put a down payment on a 22,000 square-foot warehouse.

In 1979 Rozanski purchased Richard Alf Comics' mail order division, with which he gained systems and methods for greatly expanding his mail order sales. To that end, he created Alternate Realities Distributing, Inc., a wholesale distributor run by Rozanski's wife Nanette. The Rozanskis eventually sold Alternate Realities to Bud Plant in 1987.

In 1980, Rozanski purchased a double-page ad in mainstream Marvel comics, listing prices for back issues he had for sale. This ad, which was the first of its kind, was a departure from the general practice of the time for its inclusion of prices, which Rozanski explains was a way to educate non-collectors as to the value of their collections. The ad affirmed that back issues were a valid commodity for the collector's market, and led not only to a boom to Mile High Comics, but to the entire back issue market. 

In 1991 Rozanski and Mile High Comics opened the first comics mega-store in Denver, which measured 11,000 square feet. The company eventually expanded to eight stores, and has grown to become one of the most successful comics specialty shops in the United States.

Writing
In 2002 Rozanski began writing the column "Tales from the Database" for the Comics Buyer's Guide.

Appearances
Rozanski drives all over the U.S. to local comics shops in order to stock Mile High's back issue inventory. He is also a frequent attendee at comic book conventions across the country.

Rozanski was one of five people whose journey to and experiences at the San Diego Comic Con were depicted in the 2011 Morgan Spurlock documentary Comic-Con Episode IV: A Fan's Hope. In the film, Rozanski seeks to sell a copy of Red Raven #1 for $500,000 in order to pay off his debts. Although he does not sell the comic book, his booth at the convention generates more profit than the previous year's, allowing Mile High Comics to move into a new 65,000 square foot warehouse.

Awards and recognition
Rozanski is widely recognized as an industry leader, and in 2003 he was awarded the Defender of Liberty Award by the Comic Book Legal Defense Fund for his long-standing dedication to the protection of free speech.

Personal life
Rozanski and his wife, Nanette, live in Boulder, Colorado with their four daughters, Rowan, Aleta, Tanith, and Elsbeth.

References

External links

Mile High Comics
"Tales from the Database" by Chuck Rozanski

American columnists
1955 births
Living people
American retail chief executives
American people of German descent